Kokia, with the common name treecotton, is a genus of flowering plants in the mallow family, Malvaceae.

All species within the genus are endemic to the Hawaiian Islands in the state of Hawaii.

Species
 Kokia cookei O.Deg. - Molokai treecotton (Molokai)
 Kokia drynarioides (Seem.) Lewton - Hawaiian treecotton Island of Hawaii
 Kokia kauaiensis (Rock) O.Deg. & Duvel - Kauai Kokio (Kauai)
 Kokia lanceolata Lewton

References

External links

 
Endemic flora of Hawaii
Malvaceae genera
Taxonomy articles created by Polbot